The Israeli–Palestinian peace process refers to the intermittent discussions held by various parties and proposals put forward in an attempt to resolve the ongoing Israeli–Palestinian conflict. Since the 1970s, there has been a parallel effort made to find terms upon which peace can be agreed to in both the Arab–Israeli conflict and in the Palestinian–Israeli conflict. Some countries have signed peace treaties, such as the Egypt–Israel (1979) and Jordan–Israel (1994) treaties, whereas some have not yet found a mutual basis to do so.

William B. Quandt, in the introduction of his book Peace Process, says: Sometime in the mid-1970s the term peace process became widely used to describe the American-led efforts to bring about a negotiated peace between Israel and its neighbors. The phrase stuck, and ever since it has been synonymous with the gradual, step-by-step approach to resolving one of the world's most difficult conflicts. In the years since 1967 the emphasis in Washington has shifted from the spelling out of the ingredients of "peace" to the "process" of getting there. … The United States has provided both a sense of direction and a mechanism. That, at its best, is what the peace process has been about. At worst, it has been little more than a slogan used to mask the marking of time.

Since the 2003 road map for peace, the current outline for a Palestinian–Israeli peace agreement has been a two-state solution; however a number of Israeli and US interpretations of this propose a series of non-contiguous Palestinian enclaves.

Views of the peace process

Palestinian views on the peace process

Palestinians have held diverse views and perceptions of the peace process. A key starting point for understanding these views is an awareness of the differing objectives sought by advocates of the Palestinian cause. 'New Historian' Israeli academic Ilan Pappe says the cause of the conflict from a Palestinian point of view dates back to 1948 with the creation of Israel (rather than Israel's views of 1967 being the crucial point and the return of occupied territories being central to peace negotiations), and that the conflict has been a fight to bring home refugees to a Palestinian state. Therefore, this for some was the ultimate aim of the peace process, and for groups such as Hamas still is. However Slater says that this "maximalist" view of a destruction of Israel in order to regain Palestinian lands, a view held by Arafat and the PLO initially, has steadily moderated from the late 1960s onwards to a preparedness to negotiate and instead seek a two-state solution. The Oslo Accords demonstrated the recognition of this acceptance by the then Palestinian leadership of the state of Israel's right to exist in return for the withdrawal of Israeli forces from the Gaza Strip and West Bank. However, there are recurrent themes prevalent throughout peace process negotiations including a feeling that Israel offers too little and a mistrust of its actions and motives. Yet, the demand for a right of return by the Palestinian refugees to Israel has remained a cornerstone of the Palestinian view and has been repeatedly enunciated by Palestinian president Mahmoud Abbas who is leading the Palestinian peace effort.

Israeli views on the peace process

There are several Israeli views of the peace process. The official position of the State of Israel is that peace ought to be negotiated on the basis of giving up some control of the occupied territories in return for a stop to the conflict and violence. Israel's position is that Palestinian President Mahmoud Abbas ought to be the negotiating partner in the peace talks, and not Hamas, which has at times engaged with Israel in escalations of the conflict and attacks Israel's civilian population. The Oslo Accords and the Camp David 2000 summit negotiations revealed the possibility of a two state system being accepted by Israeli leadership as a possible peace solution.

The two-state solution is the consensus position among the majority of Israelis. However, the violence of the second intifada and the political success of Hamas (a group dedicated to Israel's destruction) have convinced many Israelis that peace and negotiation are not possible and a two state system is not the answer. Hardliners believe that Israel should annex all Palestinian territory, or at least all minus the Gaza Strip. Israelis view the peace process as hindered and near impossible due to terrorism on the part of Palestinians and do not trust Palestinian leadership to maintain control. In fact, Pedahzur goes as far as to say that suicide terrorism succeeded where peace negotiations failed in encouraging withdrawal by Israelis from cities in the West Bank. A common theme throughout the peace process has been a feeling that the Palestinians give too little in their peace offers.

US views on the peace process
There are divergent views on the peace process held by US officials, citizens and lobbying groups. All recent US Presidents have maintained a policy that Israel must give up some of the land that it conquered in the 1967 war in order to achieve peace; that the Palestinians must actively prevent terrorism; and that Israel has an unconditional right to exist. Presidents Bill Clinton and George W. Bush publicly supported the creation of a new Palestinian state out of most of the current Palestinian territories, based on the idea of self-determination for the Palestinian people, and President Obama continued that policy. Secretary of State Hillary Clinton thought that peace can only be achieved through direct, bilateral negotiations between Israel and the Palestinians. Obama outlined the pursuit of the two-state solution as American policy for achieving Palestinian aspirations, Israeli security, and a measure of stability in the Middle East.

According to the sociologist Mervin Verbit, American Jews are "more right than left" on peace process issues. Verbit found that surveys of American Jews often reflect the view of the poll's sponsors. Often it is the wording of the survey questions that bias the outcome (a headline illustrating this point reads "ADL poll shows higher support for Israel than did survey by dovish J Street"). Using survey data from the American Jewish Committee where findings could not be attributed to wording biases, Verbit found American Jews took a rightward shift following the collapse of the Camp David talks in 2000, and the 9/11 attacks in 2001.

Major current issues between the two sides

There are numerous issues to resolve before a lasting peace can be reached, including the following:

 Borders and division of the land;
 Strong emotions relating to the conflict on both sides;
 Palestinian concerns over Israeli settlements in the West Bank;
 Status of Jerusalem;
 Security concerns over terrorism, safe borders, incitements, violence;
 Right of return of Palestinian refugees living in the Palestinian diaspora.

From the Israeli perspective, a key concern is security, and whether the major Palestinian figures and institutions are in fact trying to fight terrorism and promote tolerance and co-existence with Israel. Israeli concerns are based on abundant documentary and empirical evidence of many Palestinian leaders having in fact promoted and supported terrorist groups and activities. Furthermore, there is much concrete evidence of Palestinians having supported and expressed incitement against Israel, its motives, actions, and basic rights as a state. The election of Hamas has provided evidence for this view, with the Hamas charter stating unequivocally that it does not recognize Israel's right to exist. However, there remain some activists on the Palestinian side who claim that there are still some positive signs on the Palestinian side, and that Israel should use these to cultivate some positive interactions with the Palestinians, even in spite of Hamas's basic opposition to the existence of the Jewish State. Since mid-June 2007, Israel has cooperated with Palestinian security forces in the West Bank at unprecedented levels, thanks in part to United States-sponsored training, equipping, and funding of the Palestinian National Security Forces and Presidential Guard.

A further concern is whether, as a result of this security argument, Israel will in fact allow the Palestinian community to emerge as a viable and sovereign political unit, a viable and contiguous state. There are also various economic and political restrictions placed on Palestinian people, activities, and institutions which have had a detrimental effect on the Palestinian economy and quality of life. Israel has said repeatedly that these restrictions are necessary due to security concerns, and in order to counteract ongoing efforts which promote terrorism which incite opposition to Israel's existence and rights as a country. The key obstacle therefore remains the Israeli demand for security versus Palestinian claims for rights and statehood.

Furthermore, the identification of 'Palestinian' with 'terrorist' can be construed as problematic, and Sayigh argues that this association is used as a rationale for maintaining the status quo, and that only by recognising the status of Jewish immigrants as 'settlers' can we conceptually move forwards. However, it is the case that the Palestinian resort to militancy has made such conceptual clarity difficult to achieve.

Nevertheless, there is a range of ulterior motives for Israel's denial of Palestinian statehood. If Palestine were declared a state, then immediately, Israel, by its present occupation of the West Bank will be in breach of the United Nations Charter. Palestine, as a state, could legitimately call upon the inherent right of individual or collective self-defense under Article 51 of the Charter to remove Israel from the occupied territories. Palestine, as a state, would be able to accede to international conventions and bring legal action against Israel on various matters. Palestine could accede to various international human rights instruments, such as the Covenant on Civil and Political Rights. It could even join the International Criminal Court and file cases against Israel for war crimes. It would be a tinderbox of a situation that is highly likely to precipitate conflict in the Middle East.

There is a lively debate around the shape that a lasting peace settlement would take (see for example the One-state solution and Two-state solution). Authors like Cook have argued that the one-state solution is opposed by Israel because the very nature of Zionism and Jewish nationalism calls for a Jewish majority state, whilst the two-state solution would require the difficult relocation of half a million Jewish settlers living in the West Bank and East Jerusalem. The Palestinian leaders such as Salam Fayyad have rejected calls for a binational state or unilateral declaration of statehood. As of 2010, only a minority of Palestinians and Israelis support the one-state solution. Interest in a one-state solution is growing, however, as the two-state approach fails to accomplish a final agreement.

Background

Peace efforts with confrontation states

There were parallel efforts for peace treaties between Israel and other "confrontation states": Egypt, Jordan and Syria after the Six-Day war, and Lebanon afterwards. UN resolution 242 was accepted by Israel, Jordan, and Egypt, but rejected by Syria until 1972–1973.

In 1970, US Secretary of State William P. Rogers proposed the Rogers Plan, which called for a 90-day cease-fire, a military standstill zone on each side of the Suez Canal, and an effort to reach agreement in the framework of UN Resolution 242. Israel rejected the plan on 10 December 1969, calling it "an attempt to appease [the Arabs] at the expense of Israel." The Soviets dismissed it as "one-sided" and "pro-Israeli." President Nasser rejected it because it was a separate deal with Israel even if Egypt recovered all of Sinai.

No breakthrough occurred even after President Sadat in 1972 surprised most observers by suddenly expelling Soviet military advisers from Egypt and again signaled to the United States government his willingness to negotiate based on the Rogers plan.

Arab–Israeli peace diplomacy and treaties

 1949 Armistice Agreements
 Allon Plan
 Rogers Plan
 Geneva Conference (1973)
 Camp David Accords (1978)
 Egypt–Israel peace treaty (1979)
 Madrid Conference of 1991
 Oslo Accords (1993)
 Israel–Jordan peace treaty (1994)
 2000 Camp David Summit

Timeline

Madrid (1991–93)

In 1991, Israel and the Arab countries directly involved in the Arab–Israeli conflict came to the Madrid Peace Conference, called by US president George H. W. Bush (with the help of Secretary of State James Baker) after the First Gulf War. The talks continued in Washington, DC, but yielded only few results.

Oslo (1993-2001)

While the slow moving Madrid talks were taking place, a series of secret meetings between Israeli and Palestinian negotiators were taking place in Oslo, Norway, which resulted in the 1993 Oslo Peace Accords between Palestinians and Israel, a plan discussing the necessary elements and conditions for a future Palestinian state "on the basis of Security Council Resolutions 242 and 338". The agreement, officially titled the Declaration of Principles on Interim Self-Government Arrangements (DOP), was signed on the White House lawn on 13 September 1993.

Various "transfers of power and responsibilities" in the Gaza Strip and West Bank from Israel to the Palestinians took place in the mid-1990s. The Palestinians achieved self-governance of major cities in the West Bank and the entire Gaza Strip. Israel maintained and continues to maintain a presence in the West Bank for security reasons. In 2013 Israel still had control of 61% of the West Bank, while the Palestinians had control of civic functions for most of the Palestinian population.

After the assassination of Yitzhak Rabin in 1995, the peace process eventually ground to a halt. The settlements' population almost doubled in the West Bank. Later suicide bombing attacks from Palestinian militant groups and the subsequent retaliatory actions from the Israeli military made conditions for peace negotiations untenable.

1996–99 agreements
Newly elected Prime Minister Benjamin Netanyahu declared a new policy following the many suicide attacks by Hamas and Palestinian Islamic Jihad since 1993, including a wave of suicide attacks prior to the Israeli elections of May 1996. Netanyahu declared a tit-for-tat policy which he termed "reciprocity," whereby Israel would not engage in the peace process if Arafat continued with what Netanyahu defined as the Palestinian revolving door policy, i.e., incitement and direct or indirect support of terrorism. The Hebron and Wye Agreements were signed during this period, after Israel considered that its conditions were partially met.

Protocol Concerning the Redeployment in Hebron, also known as the Hebron Protocol or Hebron Agreement, began 7 January and was concluded from 15 to 17 January 1997 between Israel and the PLO. The agreement dealt with the redeployment of Israeli military forces in Hebron in accordance with the Oslo Accords, security issues and other concerns.

The Wye River Memorandum was a political agreement negotiated to implement the Oslo Accords, completed on 23 October 1998. It was signed by Israeli Prime Minister Benjamin Netanyahu and PLO Chairman Yasser Arafat. It was negotiated at Wye River, Maryland (at the Wye River Conference Center) and signed at the White House with President Bill Clinton as the official witness. On 17 November 1998, Israel's 120-member parliament, the Knesset, approved the Memorandum by a vote of 75–19. The agreement dealt with further redeployments in the West Bank, security issues and other concerns.

Camp David 2000 Summit, Clinton's "Parameters," and the Taba talks

In 2000, US President Bill Clinton convened a peace summit between Palestinian President Yasser Arafat and Israeli Prime Minister Ehud Barak. In May of that year, according to Nathan Thrall, Israel had offered Palestinians 66% of the West Bank, with 17% annexed to Israel, and a further 17% not annexed but under Israeli control, and no compensating swap of Israeli territory. The Israeli prime minister offered the Palestinian leader between 91% and 95% (sources differ on the exact percentage) of the West Bank and the entire Gaza Strip if 69 Jewish settlements (which comprise 85% of the West Bank's Jewish settlers) be ceded to Israel. East Jerusalem would have fallen for the most part under Israeli sovereignty, with the exception of most suburbs with heavy non-Jewish populations surrounded by areas annexed to Israel. The issue of the Palestinian right of return would be solved through significant monetary reparations.

Arafat rejected this offer and did not propose a counter-offer. No tenable solution was crafted which would satisfy both Israeli and Palestinian demands, even under intense U.S. pressure. Clinton blamed Arafat for the failure of the Camp David Summit. In the months following the summit, Clinton appointed former US Senator George J. Mitchell to lead a fact-finding committee that later published the Mitchell Report.

Proposed in the fall of 2000 following the collapse of the Camp David talks, The Clinton Parameters included a plan on which the Palestinian State was to include 94-96% of the West Bank, and around 80% of the settlers were to become under Israeli sovereignty, and in exchange for that, Israel would concede some territory (so called 'Territory Exchange' or 'Land Swap') within the Green Line (1967 borders). The swap would consist of 1–3% of Israeli territory, such that the final borders of the West Bank part of the Palestinian state would include 97% of the land of the original borders.

At the Taba summit (at Taba) in January 2001 talks continued based on the Clinton Parameters. The Israeli negotiation team presented a new map. The proposition removed the "temporarily Israeli controlled" areas from the West Bank and offered a few thousand more refugees than they offered at Camp David to settle into Israel and hoped that this would be considered "implementation" of United Nations General Assembly Resolution 194. The Palestinian side accepted this as a basis for further negotiation.  However, Barak did not conduct further negotiations at that time; the talks ended without an agreement and the following month the right-wing Likud party candidate Ariel Sharon was elected Israeli prime minister in February 2001.

The Arab peace initiative and the Roadmap (2002/3)

The Beirut summit of Arab government leaders took place in March 2002 under the aegis of the Arab League. The summit concluded by presenting a plan to end the Israeli-Palestinian conflict. Israeli Foreign Minister Shimon Peres welcomed it and said, "... the details of every peace plan must be discussed directly between Israel and the Palestinians, and to make this possible, the Palestinian Authority must put an end to terror, the horrifying expression of which we witnessed just last night in Netanya", referring to the Netanya suicide attack perpetrated on the previous evening which the Beirut Summit failed to address. Israel was not prepared to enter negotiations as called for by the Arab League plan on the grounds that it did not wish for "full withdrawal to 1967 borders and the right of return for the Palestinian refugees".

In July 2002, the "quartet" of the United States, the European Union, the United Nations, and Russia outlined the principles of a "road map" for peace, including an independent Palestinian state. The road map was released in April 2003 after the appointment of Mahmoud Abbas (AKA Abu Mazen) as the first-ever Palestinian Authority Prime Minister. Both the US and Israel called for a new Prime Minister position, as both refused to work with Arafat anymore.

The plan called for independent actions by Israel and the Palestinian Authority, with disputed issues put off until a rapport can be established. In the first step, the Palestinian Authority must "undertake visible efforts on the ground to arrest, disrupt, and restrain individuals and groups conducting and planning violent attacks on Israelis anywhere" and a "rebuilt and refocused Palestinian Authority security apparatus" must "begin sustained, targeted, and effective operations aimed at confronting all those engaged in terror and dismantlement of terrorist capabilities and infrastructure." Israel was then required to dismantle settlements established after March 2001, freeze all settlement activity, remove its army from Palestinian areas occupied after 28 September 2000, end curfews and ease restrictions on movement of persons and goods.

Israeli–Palestinian talks in 2007 and 2008
From December 2006 to mid-September 2008, Israeli Prime Minister Ehud Olmert and President Mahmoud Abbas of the Palestinian Authority met 36 times; there were also lower-level talks. In 2007 Olmert welcomed the Arab League's re-endorsement of the Arab Peace Initiative. In his bid to negotiate a peace accord and establish a Palestinian state, Olmert proposed a plan to the Palestinians. The centerpiece of Olmert's detailed proposal is the suggested permanent border, which would be based on an Israeli withdrawal from most of the West Bank. Olmert proposed annexing at least 6.3% of Palestinian territory, in exchange for 5.8% of Israeli land, with Palestinians receiving alternative land in the Negev, adjacent to the Gaza Strip, as well as territorial link, under Israeli sovereignty, for free passage between Gaza and the West Bank. Israel insisted on retaining an armed presence in the future Palestinian state. Under Abbas's offer, more than 60 percent of settlers would stay in place. Olmert, for his part, was presenting a plan in which the most sparsely populated settlements would be evacuated. Olmert and Abbas both acknowledged that reciprocal relations would be necessary, not hermetic separation. They also acknowledged the need to share a single business ecosystem, while cooperating intensively on water, security, bandwidth, banking, tourism and much more. Regarding Jerusalem the leaders agreed that Jewish neighborhoods should remain under Israeli sovereignty, while Arab neighborhoods would revert to Palestinian sovereignty. The Palestinians asked for clarifications of the territorial land swap since they were unable to ascertain what land his percentages affected, since Israeli and Palestinian calculations of the West Bank differ by several hundred square kilometres. For them, in lieu of such clarifications, Olmert's 6.3–6.8% annexation might work out closer to 8.5%, 4 times the 1.9% limit the Palestinians argued a swap should not exceed. The talks ended with both sides claiming the other side dropped follow-up contacts.

Following the conflict that erupted between the two main Palestinian parties, Fatah and Hamas, Hamas took control of the Gaza Strip, splintering the Palestinian Authority into two polities, each claiming to be the true representatives of the Palestinian people. Fatah controlled the Palestinian National Authority in the West Bank and Hamas governed in Gaza. Hostilities between Gaza and Israel increased. Egypt brokered the 2008 Israel–Hamas ceasefire, which lasted half a year beginning on 19 June 2008 and lasted until 19 December 2008. The collapse of the ceasefire led to the Gaza War on 27 December 2008.

2010 direct talks

In June 2009, reacting to US President Barack Obama's Cairo Address, Israeli Prime Minister Benjamin Netanyahu declared for the first time conditional support for a future Palestinian state but insisted that the Palestinians would need to make reciprocal gestures and accept several principles: recognition of Israel as the nation-state of the Jewish people;demilitarization of a future Palestinian state, along with additional security guarantees, including defensible borders for Israel; Palestinian would also have to accept that Jerusalem would remain the united capital of Israel, and renounce their claim to a right of return. He also claimed that Israeli settlements retain a right to growth and expansion in the West Bank. Palestinians rejected the proposals immediately.
In September 2010, the Obama administration pushed to revive the stalled peace process by getting the parties involved to agree to direct talks for the first time in about two years. While U.S. President Barack Obama was the orchestrator of the movement, U.S. Secretary of State Hillary Clinton went through months of cajoling just to get the parties to the table, and helped convince the reluctant Palestinians by getting support for direct talks from Egypt and Jordan. The aim of the talks was to forge the framework of a final agreement within one year, although general expectations of a success were fairly low. The talks aimed to put the Israeli–Palestinian conflict to an official end by forming a two-state solution for the Jewish and Palestinian peoples, promoting the idea of everlasting peace and putting an official halt to any further land claims, as well as accepting the rejection of any forceful retribution if violence should reoccur. Hamas and Hezbollah, however threatened violence, especially if either side seemed likely to compromise in order to reach an agreement. As a result, the Israeli government publicly stated that peace couldn't exist even if both sides signed the agreement, due to the stance taken by Hamas and Hezbollah. The US was therefore compelled to re-focus on eliminating the threat posed by the stance of Hamas and Hezbollah as part of the direct talk progress. Israel for its part, was skeptical that a final agreement was reached that the situation would change, as Hamas and Hezbollah would still get support to fuel new violence. In addition, the Israeli government rejected any possible agreement with Palestine as long as it refuses to recognize Israel as a Jewish state.

This is in accordance with the principle of the two-state solution, first proposed in the 1980s. The mainstream within the PLO have taken the concept of territorial and diplomatic compromise seriously and have showed serious interest in this. During the 2010 talks, Palestinian Authority President Mahmoud Abbas said that the Palestinians and Israel have agreed on the principle of a land swap, but Israel has yet to confirm. The issue of the ratio of land Israel would give to the Palestinians in exchange for keeping settlement blocs is an issue of dispute, with the Palestinians demanding that the ratio be 1:1, and Israel offering less. In April 2012, Mahmoud Abbas sent a letter to Benjamin Netanyahu reiterating that for peace talks to resume, Israel must stop settlement building in the West Bank, including East Jerusalem, and accept the 1967 borders as a basis for a two-state solution. In May 2012, Abbas reiterated his readiness to engage with the Israelis if they propose "anything promising or positive". Netanyahu replied to Abbas' April letter less than a week later and, for the first time, officially recognised the right for Palestinians to have their own state, though as before he declared it would have to be demilitarised, and said his new national unity government furnished a new opportunity to renew negotiations and move forward.

2013–14 talks

Direct negotiations between Israel and the Palestinians began on 29 July 2013 following an attempt by United States Secretary of State John Kerry to restart the peace process.

Martin Indyk of the Brookings Institution in Washington, D.C. was appointed by the US to oversee the negotiations. Indyk served as U.S. ambassador to Israel and assistant secretary of state for Near East affairs during the Clinton administration. Hamas, the Palestinian government in Gaza, rejected Kerry's announcement, stating that Palestinian president Mahmoud Abbas has no legitimacy to negotiate in the name of the Palestinian people.

The negotiations were scheduled to last up to nine months to reach a final status to the Palestinian-Israeli conflict by mid-2014. The Israeli negotiating team was led by veteran negotiator Justice Minister Tzipi Livni, while the Palestinian delegation was led by Saeb Erekat, also a former negotiator. Negotiations started in Washington, DC and were slated to move to the King David Hotel in Jerusalem and finally to Hebron. A deadline was set for establishing a broad outline for an agreement by 29 April 2014. On the expiry of the deadline, negotiations collapsed, with the US Special Envoy Indyk reportedly assigning blame mainly to Israel, while the US State Department insisting no one side was to blame but that "both sides did things that were incredibly unhelpful."

Israel reacted angrily to the Fatah–Hamas Gaza Agreement of 23 April 2014 whose main purpose was reconciliation between Fatah and Hamas, the formation of a Palestinian unity government and the holding of new elections. Israel halted peace talks with the Palestinians, saying it "will not negotiate with a Palestinian government backed by Hamas, a terrorist organization that calls for Israel's destruction", and threatened sanctions against the Palestinian Authority, including a previously announced Israeli plan to unilaterally deduct Palestinian debts to Israeli companies from the tax revenue Israel collects for the PA. Israeli Prime Minister Benjamin Netanyahu accused Abbas of sabotaging peace efforts. He said that Abbas cannot have peace with both Hamas and Israel and has to choose. Abbas said the deal did not contradict their commitment to peace with Israel on the basis of a two-state solution and assured reporters that any unity government would recognize Israel, be non-violent, and bound to previous PLO agreements. Shortly after, Israel began implementing economic sanctions against Palestinians and canceled plans to build housing for Palestinians in Area C of the West Bank. Abbas also threatened to dissolve the PA, leaving Israel fully responsible for both the West Bank and Gaza, a threat that the PA has not put into effect.

Notwithstanding Israeli objections and actions, the new Palestinian Unity Government was formed on 2 June 2014.

Abbas' 2014 peace plan
On 3 September 2014, Abbas presented a new proposal for the peace process to John Kerry. The plan called for nine months of direct talks followed by a three-year plan for Israel to withdraw to the 1967 lines, leaving East Jerusalem as Palestine's capital. The resumption of talks was contingent on an Israeli freeze on construction in the West Bank and east Jerusalem, as well as release the final batch of prisoners from the previous talks. The first three months of the plan would revolve around the borders and potential land swaps for the 1967 lines. The following six months would focus on issues including refugees, Jerusalem, settlements, security and water. The US administration rejected the initiative, saying it was opposed to any unilateral move that could negatively impact the Israeli–Palestinian peace process.

Abbas stated that if Israel rejected the claim he would push for charges against Israel in the International Criminal Court over the 2014 Israel–Gaza conflict. Additionally, if rejected, Abbas stated he would turn to the UN Security Council for a unilateral measure for a Palestinian State. On 1 October 2014, Abbas stated he would be presenting his plan to the UNSC within two to three weeks, with an application to the ICC to follow if it failed to pass the UNSC. In December 2014, Jordan submitted the proposal to the UNSC, which failed when voted on later that month. Later that month as previously threatened, Abbas signed the treaty to join the ICC. Israel responded by freezing NIS 500 million (US$127 million) in Palestinian tax revenues, in response to which, the PA banned the sale in the Palestinian territories of products of six major Israeli companies.

Trump plan

Following the inauguration of US President Donald Trump in January 2017, a period of uncertainty regarding a new peace initiative began. In early 2018, some media sources reported the new administration was preparing a new peace initiative for an Israeli-Palestinian deal.  The White House unveiled the economic part of the Trump initiative, titled Peace to Prosperity: The Economic Plan, in June 2019, and the political portion of the plan in January 2020. Palestinian leaders boycotted and condemned the Bahrain conference in late June 2019 at which the economic plan was unveiled.

In December 2017, Palestinian president Mahmoud Abbas cut ties with the Trump administration after United States recognition of Jerusalem as capital of Israel. The Trump administration further raised Palestinians' ire when it moved the US embassy to Jerusalem in May 2018, and cut hundreds of millions of dollars in annual aid to the Palestinians, citing the PA's refusal to take part in the administration's peace initiative.

Munich group
In February 2020, on the sidelines of the Munich Security Conference, the foreign ministers of Egypt, France, German and Jordan, the Munich Group, together discussed peace efforts. In July, the same quartet issued a statement declaring that "any annexation of Palestinian territories occupied in 1967 would be a violation of international law" and "would have serious consequences for the security and stability of the region and would constitute a major obstacle to efforts aimed at achieving a comprehensive and just peace",. The foreign ministers said they "discussed how to restart a fruitful engagement between the Israeli and the Palestinian side, and offer our support in facilitating a path to negotiations".

Meeting in Jordan on 24 September the four again called for a resumption of negotiations between the two sides. There will be "no comprehensive and lasting peace without solving the conflict on the basis of the two-state solution", Jordanian Foreign Minister Ayman al-Safadi told reporters following the meeting. The four also praised recent deals establishing ties between Israel and the United Arab Emirates and Bahrain. Egypt's Sameh Shoukry said the deals are an "important development that would lead to more support and interaction in order to reach a comprehensive peace". However Palestinians see the two accords as a betrayal.

On 11 January 2021, the group met in Cairo to discuss "possible steps to advance the peace process in the Middle East and create an environment conducive to the resumption of dialogue between the Palestinians and the Israelis." A joint statement of the quartet confirmed its intention to work with the incoming administration of President-elect Joe Biden. A further meeting is set to be held in Paris.

The four met in Paris on 11 March 2021, with United Nations Special Coordinator for the Middle East Peace Process Tor Wennesland and the European Union Special Representative for the Middle East Peace Process, Susanna Terstal. Their statement emphasized the importance of confidence-building measures to promote dialogue, support for the two-state solution and stated that settlement activities violate international law.

On 19 February 2021, at the Munich Security Conference, as well as reaffirming support for a two state solution, the group condemned the expansion of Israeli settlements and the ongoing Palestinian displacement in East Jerusalem, in particular in Sheikh Jarrah.

On 22 September 2022, the group met with Josep Borrell, High Representative of the European Union for Foreign Affairs and Security Policy, and the United Nations Special Coordinator for the Middle East Peace Process, Tor Wennesland, and in a statement said "with a view to advancing the Middle East Peace Process towards a just, comprehensive and lasting peace on the basis of the two-state solution".

Quartet developments

In July 2016, the Quartet reported:The continuing policy of settlement construction and expansion in the West Bank and East Jerusalem, designation of land for exclusive Israeli use, and denial of Palestinian development, including the recent high rate of demolitions, is steadily eroding the viability of the two-state solution. This raises legitimate questions about Israel's long-term intentions, which are compounded by the statements of some Israeli ministers that there should never be a Palestinian state. In fact, the transfer of greater powers and responsibilities to Palestinian civil authority...has effectively been stopped. It was within this context that the United Nations passed Security Council Resolution 2334 in December 2016 in another bid to address the settlement question. The report was significantly altered to appease Israel and as well as urging Israel to stop its settlement policy, urged Palestine to end incitement to violence.

In a speech to the UN General Assembly in September, 2018, Mahmoud Abbas called Donald Trump's policies towards Palestinians an "assault on international law". He said the US is "too biased towards Israel" indicating that others could broker talks and that the US could participate as a member of the Middle East peace Quartet. Abbas reiterated this position at a UN Security Council meeting on 11 February 2020.

As of 16 September 2020, the UN has not been able to gather the consensus necessary for the Quartet or a group of countries linked to the Quartet to meet. On 25 September 2020, at the UN, Abbas called for an international conference early in 2021 to "launch a genuine peace process."

On 15 February 2021, the quartet envoys met virtually and agreed to meet on a regular basis to continue their engagement. On 23 March 2021, the Quartet discussed the reviving of "meaningful negotiations" between Israel and the Palestinians who both need "to refrain from unilateral actions that make a two-state solution more difficult to achieve."

Alternative peace proposals
Another approach was taken by a team of negotiators led by former Israeli Justice Minister Yossi Beilin, and former Palestinian Information Minister Yasser Abed Rabbo following two and a half years of secret negotiations. On 1 December 2003, the two parties signed an unofficial suggested plan for peace in Geneva (dubbed the Geneva Accord). In sharp contrast to the road map, it is not a plan for a temporary ceasefire but a comprehensive and detailed solution aiming at all the issues at stake, in particular, Jerusalem, the settlements and the refugee problem. It was met with bitter denunciation by the Israeli government and many Palestinians, with the Palestinian Authority staying non-committal, but it was warmly welcomed by many European governments and some significant elements of the Bush Administration, including Secretary of State Colin Powell.

Yet another approach was proposed by a number of parties inside and outside Israel: a "binational solution" whereby Israel would formally annex the Palestinian territories but would make the Palestinian Arabs citizens in a unitary secular state. Championed by Edward Said and New York University professor Tony Judt, the suggestion aroused both interest and condemnation. It was not actually a new idea, dating back as far as the 1920s, but it was given extra prominence by the growing demographic issues raised by a rapidly expanding Arab population in Israel and the territories.  Considering the huge political and demographic issues that it would raise, however, it seems an improbable solution to the problem.

The Elon Peace Plan is a solution for the Arab-Israeli conflict proposed in 2002 by former minister Binyamin Elon. The plan advocates the formal annexation of West Bank and Gaza by Israel and that Palestinians will become either Jordanian citizens or permanent residents in Israel so long as they remained peaceful and law-abiding residents. All these actions should be done in agreement with Jordan and the Palestinian population. This solution is tied to the demographics of Jordan where it's claimed that Jordan is essentially already the Palestinian state, as it has so many Palestinian refugees and their descendants.

Some difficulties with past peace processes
A common feature of all attempts to create a path which would lead to peace is the fact that more often than not promises to carry out "good will measures" were not carried out by both sides. Furthermore, negotiations to attain agreement on the "final status" have been interrupted due to outbreak of hostilities. The result is that both Israelis and Palestinians have grown weary of the process. Israelis point out the fact that the Gaza Strip is fully controlled by the Hamas who do not want peace with Israel. According to the Israeli view, this limits the ability of the Palestinians to make peace with Israel and enforce it over the long term. Furthermore, in the Israeli view, a violent overtake of the West Bank by the Hamas as a result of the creation of an unstable new state is likely. Lastly, rhetoric from high-ranking Fatah officials promising a full, literal Palestinian right of return into Israel (a position no Israeli government can accept without destroying the Jewish character of Israel) makes peace negotiations more difficult for both sides. The Palestinians point out to the extensive and continuing Israeli settlement effort in the West Bank restricting the area available to the Palestinian state.

An attempt to change the rules was made by Condoleezza Rice and Tzipi Livni when they brought forth the concept of a shelf agreement. The idea was to disengage the linkage between negotiations and actions on the ground. In theory this would allow negotiations until a "shelf agreement" defining peace would be obtained. Such an agreement would not entail implementation. It would just describe what peace is. It would stay on the shelf but eventually will guide the implementation. The difficulty with this notion is that it creates a dis-incentive for Israel to reach such an agreement. The lack of clarity about what happens after agreement is reached will result in insurmountable pressures on Abbas to demand immediate implementation. However, from the Israeli point of view, the Palestinians are not ready to create a stable state, such an implementation process will almost guarantee instability in the Palestinian areas with a possible Hamas takeover as happened in Gaza.

As things stand now this brings the process to another impasse. To avoid it some definition of what happens after a shelf agreement is needed. One possible idea by this essay is to agree ahead of time that following attainment of a final status agreement there will be a negotiated detailed and staged implementation agreement which would define a process which would allow the creation of a stable functional Palestinian state in stages and over time. In Aug 2013 an indication that such an idea can be acceptable to the Palestinians was given by Mahmud Abbas in a meeting with Meretz MK-s. In the meeting Abbas stated "that there cannot be an interim agreement but only a final status deal that can be implemented in stages".

Joint economic effort and development

Despite the long history of conflict between Israelis and Palestinians, there are many people working on peaceful solutions that respect the rights of peoples on both sides.

In March 2007, Japan proposed a plan for peace based on common economic development and effort, rather than on continuous wrangling over land. Both sides stated their support. This became the Peace Valley plan, a joint effort of the Israeli, Palestinian and Jordanian governments to promote economic cooperation, and new business initiatives which can help both sides work together, and create a better diplomatic atmosphere and better economic conditions. It is mainly designed to foster efforts in the private sector, once governments provide the initial investment and facilities.

See also
 Israel–Palestine relations
 Cold peace
 Israeli transfer of Palestinian militant bodies (2012)
 The Land of the Settlers
 Peace Now
 OneVoice Movement
 Women Wage Peace Movement
 Tolerance Monument
 Arab League and the Arab–Israeli conflict
 Americans for Peace Now
 Seeds of Peace
 The Case for Peace
 PeaceMaker (computer game)
 Projects working for peace among Arabs and Israelis
 List of Middle East peace proposals
 The Environmental Provisions of Oslo II Accords
 Israeli–Palestinian economic peace efforts
 History of the State of Palestine
 Paris Peace Conference (1919–1920)
 Faisal–Weizmann Agreement (1919)
 Peel Commission
 International law and the Arab–Israeli conflict

Notes

References

External links
 Israel-Palestinian Negotiations, Israel Ministry of Foreign Affairs
 The Reut Institute
 BBC News – History of Mid-East peace talks
 Palestinian-Israeli Relations, MyJewishLearning.com
 "Netanyahu's two-state mask has slipped" by Henry Siegman
 "The Arab-Israeli Peace Process Is Over. Enter the Era of Chaos" by Lee Smith
 "Netanyahu lowers expectations for Israeli-Palestinian peace" by Lahav Harkov
 A presentation of the Lubavitcher Rebbe's views on the Jewish people's connection with the Holy Land, the Arab-Israeli conflict, and the so-called "Land for Peace" issue
 The Israel Project: Timeline of Israeli-Arab Peace Initiatives since 1977
 The History of the Peace Process in the Context of the 2013 John Kerry Peace Efforts Konrad-Adenauer-Stiftung, Palestinian Territories August 2013
 Beyond Intractability: A Free Knowledge Base on More Constructive Approaches to Destructive Conflict
 The Jerusalem Fund Resources